Crambus uniformella is a moth in the family Crambidae. It was described by Anthonie Johannes Theodorus Janse in 1922. It is found in South Africa.

References

Endemic moths of South Africa
Crambini
Moths described in 1922
Moths of Africa